Catfish Stephenson is an American blues musician, living and working in Madison, Wisconsin, United States. One of the city's best established street musicians (he has played on State Street since 1968), he has performed widely across the Midwest, has toured the United States and Europe, and performed live on A Prairie Home Companion. Stephenson is best known for playing slide guitar on a National steel guitar.

Stephenson has influenced numerous younger musicians, including the Chicago-based guitarist, Joel Paterson, who met and played with Stephenson when the former was a teenager. Guitarist John Hasbrouck was mentored by Stephenson during the 1980s. Hasbrouck later dedicated his debut solo album, Ice Cream, to him.

References

Year of birth missing (living people)
Living people
American blues guitarists
American male guitarists
Guitarists from Wisconsin
Musicians from Madison, Wisconsin